The Good, the Bad, the Weird is a 2008 South Korean Western action film directed by Kim Jee-woon and starring Song Kang-ho, Lee Byung-hun, and Jung Woo-sung. The film is inspired by the 1966 Italian Spaghetti Western The Good, the Bad and the Ugly.

The film premiered at the 2008 Cannes Film Festival and had a limited release in the U.S. on April 23, 2010. It received positive reviews with critics praising the action, the cinematography and the direction. The film marks the second collaboration between actor Lee Byung-hun and director Kim Jee-woon, who had previously collaborated on the action drama A Bittersweet Life (2005) and would later do so again in Kim's I Saw the Devil (2010).

Plot
In the desert wilderness of Manchuria in 1939, months before the beginning of the Second World War. Park Chang-yi, The Bad (Lee Byung-hun)—a bandit and hitman—is hired to acquire a treasure map from a Japanese official traveling by train. Before he can get it however, Yoon Tae-goo, The Weird (Song Kang-ho)—a thief—steals the map and is caught up in The Bad's derailment of the train. This involves the slaughter of the Japanese and Manchurian guards, and various civilians. Park Do-won, The Good (Jung Woo-sung)—an eagle-eyed bounty hunter—appears on the scene to claim the bounty on Chang-yi. Meanwhile, Tae-goo escapes, eluding his Good and Bad pursuers. A fourth force—a group of Manchurian bandits—also want the map to sell to the Ghost Market. Tae-goo hopes to uncover the map's secrets and recover what he believes is gold and riches buried by the Qing Dynasty just before the collapse of their government. As the story continues, an escalating battle for the map occurs, with bounties placed on heads and the Imperial Japanese Army racing to reclaim its map as it can apparently "save the Japanese Empire".

After a series of graphic shootouts and chases, a final battle erupts in which the Japanese army, Manchurian bandits, Do-won, Chang-yi and his gang are chasing Tae-goo all at once. The Japanese army kills most of the bandits. Do-won kills many Japanese soldiers and sets off an explosion that drives them away. Chang-yi's gang is slowly killed off and he kills those that attempt to leave the chase. Only Chang-yi, Tae-goo and Do-won make it to the "treasure". However, they find that it is nothing more than a boarded-over hole in the desert. Chang-yi recognizes Tae-goo as the "Finger Chopper"—a criminal that cut off his finger in a knife fight five years ago—and the man that Do-won had thought Chang-yi to be. Turning on each other in a final act of vengeance for the slights they suffered, they finally gun each other down after a prolonged Mexican standoff. The three lie in the sand, dying and alone, as the "useless hole" that they fought and died for suddenly and belatedly erupts with a geyser of crude oil. Do-won survives along with Tae-goo. With a newly raised bounty on Tae-goo, a new chase begins as he flees across the Manchurian desert.

Cast
 Song Kang-ho as Yoon Tae-goo, the Weird
 Lee Byung-hun as Park Chang-yi, the Bad
 Jung Woo-sung as Park Do-won, the Good
 Yoon Je-moon as Byeong-choon, Manchurian Bandit Leader's Right-hand man
 Ryu Seung-soo as Man-gil, Yoon Tae-goo's friend
 Song Yeong-chang as Kim Pan-joo
 Ma Dong-seok as Gom (Bear)
 Son Byong-ho as Seo Jae-sik
 Oh Dal-su as Park Seo-bang
 Uhm Ji-won as Na-yeon (cameo)
 Oh Yeon-ah as Japanese female train passenger (cameo)

Alternative versions
Two versions of the film were released in cinemas: one being for the native Korean market and the other for international sales. The Korean theatrical cut is 136 minutes long and the international cut is 129 minutes long. The Korean ending is more "upbeat" than the international version, including several more minutes of footage. In the alternative ending, The Weird, Tae-goo, gets up. He reveals the thick metal sheet he hid under his quilted jacket and limps over to demolish the corpse of Chang-yi, The Bad. While doing so, he discovers diamonds in Chang-yi's pocket and giggles with delight before realising he's surrounded by the Japanese army. Inadvertently lighting a stick of dynamite, Tae-goo scares off the Japanese and dives for cover after realising it was lit. Over the credits, Tae-goo sets off to continue hunting for the treasure with his bounty multiplied sevenfold, while The Good, Do-won, vindictively pursues him. The ending of the international version reflects the end that director Kim Jee-woon originally wanted.

In the United Kingdom, the British Board of Film Classification ordered five seconds of cuts to the cinema release due to scenes of horse falls judged to be animal cruelty that violated the Cinematograph Films (Animals) Act 1937.

Reception
The film was screened out of competition at the Cannes Film Festival on May 24, 2008. It also received screenings at the Toronto International Film Festival, Hawaii International Film Festival, Sitges Film Festival, Chicago International Film Festival, and the London Film Festival.

American distribution rights were acquired by IFC Films, who released it in theaters on a limited basis on April 23, 2010.

The Good, the Bad, the Weird received generally positive reviews. Review aggregating website Rotten Tomatoes reported that 84% of 60 sampled critics gave the film positive reviews and that it got a rating average of 7.2 out of 10 stating that "Whilst never taking itself too seriously, this riotous and rollicking Sergio Leone-inspired Korean Western is serious fun." On Metacritic, it received generally favorable reviews with a total score of 69. Variety said that "East meets West meets East again, with palate-tingling results, in 'The Good the Bad the Weird', a kimchi Western that draws shamelessly on its spaghetti forebears but remains utterly, bracingly Korean" awarding the film 3.5 out of 5 stars.  The A.V. Club gave it a B+ saying that "The story’s many advances and reversals can be hard to follow at times, but this isn’t really a movie where plot is paramount. Everything boils down to the action, and what that action means". The New York Post gave it a four star rating out of five stating that "The Good, the Bad, the Weird may owe a lot to other films but it is always fresh and never boring". Empire magazine gave it a three star rating out of five commenting that "A tangled narrative and damp -squib ending detract from an otherwise joyous Spaghetti Eastern Western." Time Out critic Tom Huddlestone stated that "This is filmmaking as rodeo ride: bruising and ultimately pointless, but thrilling as hell while it lasts" and awarded the film four out of five stars. The Hollywood Reporter gave it a positive review declaring the film "a jaunty, happy-go-lucky adventure that packs a fistful of dynamite in the spectacular showdown."

On the other hand, there were criticism directed towards the excessive violence and the simplicity of the script. In particular, the Village Voices Nicolas Rapold mentioned that "Kim's filmmaking is generally cartoonish in a bad sense, as he squanders his set pieces, flashbacks, and other attention-getting with sometimes downright wretched staging" while The Boston Globe wrote that the film "goes for shallow pop instead of narrative depth. It's a lot of fun before it wears you out, and it wears you out sooner than it should." Additionally, Robert Abele from the Los Angeles Times mentioned that "Knives, explosions and knockabout humor have been added to taste. As vigorously staged as it all is -- sometimes confusingly, occasionally with camera-torqueing flair and impressive stuntwork -- the urge to thrill grows wearisome. Were audience members to be included as a collective character as well, they'd be 'The Tired'."

Box office
It was the second highest grossing Korean film in 2008 after Scandal Makers, beating The Chaser and it is one of the highest grossing films of all time in South Korea.

Home media 
The film was released on DVD on March 11, 2009.  The Korean release contains a longer version of the film and the international release has a slightly shorter cut with English subtitles.

Awards and nominations
2008 Sitges Film Festival
Best Director – Kim Jee-woon
Best Special Effects – Jeong Do-an 
Nomination – Best Film

2008 Hawaii International Film Festival
Maverick Award – Kim Jee-woon
Best Supporting Actor – Jung Woo-sung

2008 Asia Pacific Screen Awards
Achievement in Cinematography – Lee Mo-gae
Nomination – Achievement in Directing – Kim Jee-woon

2008 Buil Film Awards
Best Cinematography – Lee Mo-gae
Best Art Direction – Cho Hwa-sung 
Technical Award – Jeong Do-an (Special Effects)
Special Jury Prize – Ji Jung-hyeon
Nomination – Best Actor – Jung Woo-sung 
Nomination – Best Supporting Actor – Song Young-chang
Nomination – Best Editing – Nam Na-yeong
Nomination – Best Music – Dalparan and Jang Young-gyu
Nomination – Buil Readers' Jury Award

2008 Blue Dragon Film Awards
Best Director – Kim Jee-woon
Best Cinematography – Lee Mo-gae
Best Art Direction – Cho Hwa-sung 
Most Popular Film
Nomination – Best Film
Nomination – Best Actor – Lee Byung-hun 
Nomination – Best Actor – Song Kang-ho 
Nomination – Best Music – Dalparan and Jang Young-gyu
Nomination – Best Lighting – Oh Seung-chul
Nomination – Technical Award – DTI

2008 Korean Film Awards
Best Cinematography – Lee Mo-gae
Best Art Direction – Cho Hwa-sung 
Best Sound
Nomination – Best Director – Kim Jee-woon 
Nomination – Best Actor – Song Kang-ho 
Nomination – Best Music – Dalparan and Jang Young-gyu

2008 Director's Cut Awards
Best Director – Kim Jee-woon

2009 Asian Film Awards
Best Supporting Actor – Jung Woo-sung
Nomination – Best Film
Nomination – Best Director – Kim Jee-woon
Nomination – Best Actor – Song Kang-ho
Nomination – Best Supporting Actor – Lee Byung-hun  
Nomination – Best Cinematography – Lee Mo-gae
Nomination – Best Composer – Dalparan and Jang Young-gyu
Nomination – Best Visual Effects – Kim Wook

2009 Baeksang Arts Awards
Nomination – Best Film
Nomination – Best Director – Kim Jee-woon
Nomination – Best Actor – Song Kang-ho

2009 Grand Bell Awards
Best Costume Design – Kwon Yu-jin
Nomination – Best Cinematography – Lee Mo-gae
Nomination – Best Editing – Nam Na-yeong
Nomination – Best Art Direction – Cho Hwa-sung 
Nomination – Best Visual Effects – Kim Wook
Nomination – Best Sound – Kim Kyung-tae

References

External links 

 
 
 
 
 
 
 

2008 films
2008 Western (genre) films
2000s action adventure films
South Korean Western (genre) films
South Korean action adventure films
Films set in the 1930s
Films set in Liaoning
Films set in Jilin
Films set in Manchukuo
Films shot in China
Films about train robbery
Films directed by Kim Jee-woon
CJ Entertainment films
Icon Productions films
2000s Korean-language films
2000s Mandarin-language films
2000s Japanese-language films
Films set in Korea under Japanese rule
Second Sino-Japanese War films
2008 multilingual films
South Korean multilingual films
2000s South Korean films